Dylan Moonan (born 4 October 2002) is an English professional footballer who plays as a midfielder for  club Accrington Stanley.

Career
Moonan joined the Academy at Burnley at the age of seven. He signed a one-year contract at Accrington Stanley on 5 July 2021, alongside Matty Carson, after the pair impressed on trial. On 31 August, he made his first-team debut for the "Reds", coming on for David Morgan as a 66th-minute substitute in an EFL Trophy tie against Barrow at the Crown Ground; Accrington won 5–4 on penalties following a 2–2 draw. 

On 15 October 2022, Moonan joined Northern Premier League Premier Division club Stalybridge Celtic on a one-month loan. He made his debut that day, opening the scoring in an eventual 2–1 defeat to Ashton United.

Style of play
Moonan is a defensive minded box-to-box midfielder.

Career statistics

References

2002 births
Living people
Footballers from Wigan
English footballers
Association football midfielders
Burnley F.C. players
Accrington Stanley F.C. players
Stalybridge Celtic F.C. players
Northern Premier League players